Vladimir Alexandrovich Ivanov (born 3 July 1987) is a Russian badminton player. He was the champion at the 2014 and 2021 European Championships, and also the 2016 All England Open partnering with Ivan Sozonov. They made history by becoming the first Russian pair to win the men's doubles title in each of those events. Ivanov competed at the 2012,  2016, and 2020 Summer Olympics.

Achievements

European Games 
Men's doubles

European Championships 
Men's singles

Men's doubles

Summer Universiade 
Men's doubles

Mixed doubles

European Junior Championships 
Mixed doubles

BWF World Tour (2 titles, 1 runner-up) 
The BWF World Tour, which was announced on 19 March 2017 and implemented in 2018, is a series of elite badminton tournaments sanctioned by the Badminton World Federation (BWF). The BWF World Tour is divided into levels of World Tour Finals, Super 1000, Super 750, Super 500, Super 300 (part of the HSBC World Tour), and the BWF Tour Super 100.

Men's doubles

Mixed doubles

BWF Superseries (1 title) 
The BWF Superseries, which was launched on 14 December 2006 and implemented in 2007, was a series of elite badminton tournaments, sanctioned by the Badminton World Federation (BWF). BWF Superseries levels were Superseries and Superseries Premier. A season of Superseries consisted of twelve tournaments around the world that had been introduced since 2011. Successful players were invited to the Superseries Finals, which were held at the end of each year.

Men's doubles

  BWF Superseries Finals tournament
  BWF Superseries Premier tournament
  BWF Superseries tournament

BWF Grand Prix (10 titles, 8 runners-up) 
The BWF Grand Prix had two levels, the Grand Prix and Grand Prix Gold. It was a series of badminton tournaments sanctioned by the Badminton World Federation (BWF) and played between 2007 and 2017.

Men's singles

Men's doubles

Mixed doubles

  BWF Grand Prix Gold tournament
  BWF Grand Prix tournament

BWF International Challenge/Series (12 titles, 7 runners-up) 
Men's singles

Men's doubles

Mixed doubles

  BWF International Challenge tournament
  BWF International Series tournament

References

External links 
 
 

1987 births
Living people
Sportspeople from Chelyabinsk
Russian male badminton players
Badminton players at the 2012 Summer Olympics
Badminton players at the 2016 Summer Olympics
Badminton players at the 2020 Summer Olympics
Olympic badminton players of Russia
Badminton players at the 2015 European Games
Badminton players at the 2019 European Games
European Games silver medalists for Russia
European Games bronze medalists for Russia
European Games medalists in badminton
Universiade medalists in badminton
Universiade silver medalists for Russia
Universiade bronze medalists for Russia
Medalists at the 2013 Summer Universiade